Myosotis dissitiflora is a species of forget-me-not native to the Caucasus. It is one of the largest-flowered species in Myosotis. There used to be a dozen of ornamental cultivars during the late 19th and early 20th centuries, but they are all lost now. Currently there exist two known cultivars, namely 'Baby Blue' and 'Myomark'.

References 

dissitiflora
Taxa named by John Gilbert Baker
Flora of Turkey
Flora of the Caucasus
Plants described in 1868